The Leichttraktor (Vs.Kfz.31) was a German experimental tank designed during the Interwar Period.

History 
After the end of World War I, Germany was restricted in military development by the Treaty of Versailles. However, a secret program under the cover name "Traktor" was developing armoured military vehicles and artillery. Its engine was mounted inside the front portion of the hull and the turret was mounted above the fighting compartment in the rear of the tank. Both Rheinmetall and Krupp produced prototypes, and in 1928, Rheinmetall's design was chosen and was awarded an order for 289 tanks. However, some time later, the order was cancelled. Krupp models had coil spring suspensions, while Rheinmetall had leaf spring suspensions.

The Germans tested the tank in the Soviet Union under the Treaty of Rapallo – agreed between the USSR and Germany in 1922 under high secrecy and security. The testing facility used from 1926 to 1933 was named Panzertruppenschule Kama, located near Kazan in the Soviet Union. The location was a joint testing ground and tank training ground for the Red Army and Reichswehr. It was codenamed "Kama" from the words Kazan and Malbrandt because the testing grounds were near Kazan and Oberstleutnant Malbrandt was assigned to select the location for testing.

Leichter Traktor ("Light tractor") was a cover name for all three medium tank designs produced there. In the early years of World War II it was used as a training tank. Although these designs were not used in actual warfare, they gave a good intuition on how to build tanks when Germany had previously only made one official tank, the A7V, and this design led to the creation of the Panzer I.

References

Citations

Bibliography

Further reading
 Tanks of the World, 1915-1945, Peter Chamberlain, Chris Ellis, 1972
 German Tanks and Armoured Vehicles 1914 - 1945, B. T. White, 1966

Light tanks of the interwar period
Interwar tanks of Germany
Light tanks of Germany
World War II tanks of Germany
World War II light tanks
Military vehicles introduced in the 1930s
Krupp
Rheinmetall
Trial and research tanks of Germany